Maati is a given name and a surname. Notable people with the name include:

 Maati Bouabid (1927–1996), Prime Minister of Morocco between 1979 and 1983
 Maati Kabbal (born 1954), Moroccan writer and essayist
 Maati Monjib (born 1962), Moroccan university professor, journalist, historian, writer and political activist
 Nasreddine Ben Maati (born 1990), Tunisian filmmaker and actor

See also
 Ahmad El-Maati (born 1964), Canadian citizen who was arrested, tortured and detained for years in Syrian and Egyptian prisons due to deficient information shared by Canadian law enforcement
 Amer el-Maati (born 1963), Kuwaiti-Canadian alleged member of al-Qaeda

Moroccan masculine given names